Sifiso Nhlapo (born 13 May 1987) is a South African racing cyclist who represents South Africa in BMX (bicycle motocross). He was selected to represent South Africa at 2008 Beijing, China Summer Olympics and the 2012 London, England Summer Olympics in the men's BMX event. Sifiso has raced professionally since 2007 and has competed in the European and USA series. Sifiso placed second at the UCI SX race in Pietermaritzburg South Africa in 2010, in front of adoring fans. 

Sifiso has become a well known public figure in South Africa and in the sporting arena. In December 2013, Sifiso married long time girlfriend Toni-Catherine Nhlapo. They reside in Florida, USA.

References

External links
 
 
 
 

1987 births
Living people
BMX riders
South African male cyclists
Olympic cyclists of South Africa
Cyclists at the 2008 Summer Olympics
Cyclists at the 2012 Summer Olympics
Sportspeople from Soweto
20th-century South African people
21st-century South African people